Ivan Ančić (11 February 1624 – 24 July 1685) was a Croatian theological writer.

He was born in Lipa near Tomislavgrad, and likely finished his basic education at the Franciscan Province of Bosna Srebrena monastery in Rama where he was ordained as a priest in 1643. He attended gymnasium in Velika and finished his philosophy-theology studies in Cremona (three years), Brixen (1650–1651) and Naples (1651–1653).

In Assisi he began his work Vrata nebeska i život vični (Heavenly Gates and Everlasting Life) in 1676 and finished it in Loreto in 1677. That same year he printed his work Ogledalo misničko in Rome. He wrote in the "Duvno style" of the Shtokavian dialect using the Latin alphabet in which there are noticeable elements of bosančica. His translations from Latin are still articulate examples of a good understanding of the language.

Apart from his printed works, two handwritten pieces have been preserved. The first is an autobiography (written in 1679), while the second is a report about the Franciscan Province of Bosna Srebrena from 1680.

He died in Ancona.

Works
 "Vrata nebeska i život vični",
 "Ogledalo misničko",
 "Svitlost karstianska i naslagaye duovno".

Sources
 

1624 births
1685 deaths
Croatian writers
17th-century Croatian Roman Catholic priests
Croatian theologians
People from Tomislavgrad